Skolt Sámi ("the Sámi language", or  , "the Eastern Sámi language", if a distinction needs to be made between it and the other Sámi languages) is a Uralic, Sámi language that is spoken by the Skolts, with approximately 300 speakers in Finland, mainly in Sevettijärvi and approximately 20–30 speakers of the Njuõʹttjäuʹrr (Notozero) dialect in an area surrounding Lake Lovozero in Russia. Skolt Sámi also used to be spoken in the Neiden area of Norway. It is written using a modified Roman orthography which was made official in 1973.

The term Skolt was coined by representatives of the majority culture and has negative connotation which can be compared to the term Lapp. Nevertheless, it is used in cultural and linguistic studies.

History

On Finnish territory Skolt Sámi was spoken in four villages before the Second World War. In Petsamo, Skolt Sámi was spoken in Suonikylä and the village of Petsamo. This area was ceded to Russia in the Second World War, and the Skolts were evacuated to the villages of Inari, Sevettijärvi and Nellim in the Inari municipality.

On the Russian (then Soviet) side the dialect was spoken in the now defunct Sámi settlements of Motovsky, Songelsky, Notozero (hence its Russian name – the Notozersky dialect). Some speakers still may live in the villages of Tuloma and Lovozero.

On Norwegian territory Skolt Sámi was spoken in the Sør-Varanger area with a cultural centre in Neiden. The language is not spoken as mother tongue any more in Norway.

Status

Finland
In Finland, Skolt Sámi is spoken by approximately 400 people. According to Finland's Sámi Language Act (1086/2003), Skolt Sámi is one of the three Sámi languages that the Sámi can use when conducting official business in Lapland. It is an official language in the municipality of Inari, and elementary schools there offer courses in the language, both for native speakers and for students learning it as a foreign language. Only a small number of youths learn the language and continue to use it actively. Skolt Sámi is thus a seriously endangered language, even more seriously than Inari Sámi, which has a nearly equal number of speakers and is even spoken in the same municipality. In addition, there are a lot of Skolts living outside of this area, particularly in the capital region.

Use

Media
From 1978 to 1986, the Skolts had a quarterly called Sääʹmođđâz published in their own language. Since 2013, a new magazine called Tuõddri peeʹrel has been published once a year.

The Finnish news program Yle Ođđasat featured a Skolt Sámi speaking newsreader for the first time on August 26, 2016. Otherwise Yle Ođđasat presents individual news stories in Skolt Sámi every now and then. In addition, there have been various TV programs in Skolt Sámi on YLE such as the children's TV series Binnabánnaš.

Religion
The first book published in Skolt Sámi was an Eastern Orthodox prayer book (Prayerbook for the Orthodox) in 1983. Translation of the Gospel of John was published in 1988 and Liturgy of Saint John Chrysostom (Liturgy of our Holy Father John Chrysostom) was published in 2002  Skolt Sámi is used together with Finnish in worship of the Lappi Orthodox Parish at churches of Ivalo, Sevettijärvi and Nellim.

Music
Like Inari Sámi, Skolt Sámi has recently borne witness to a new phenomenon, namely it is being used in rock songs
sung by Tiina Sanila-Aikio, who has published two full-length CDs in Skolt Sámi to date.

Education
In 1993, language nest programs for children younger than 7 were created. For quite some time these programs received intermittent funding, resulting in some children being taught Skolt Sámi, while others were not. In spite of all the issues these programs faced, they were crucial in creating the youngest generations of Skolt Sámi speakers. In recent years, these programs have been reinstated.

In addition, 2005 was the first time that it was possible to use Skolt Sámi in a Finnish matriculation exam, albeit as a foreign language. In 2012, Ville-Riiko Fofonoff was the first person to use Skolt Sámi for the mother tongue portion of the exam; for this, he won the Skolt of the Year Award the same year.

Writing system

Skolt Sámi uses the ISO basic Latin alphabet with the addition of some special characters:

Notes:
 The letters Q/q, W/w, X/x, Y/y and Ö/ö are also used, although only in foreign words or loans. Exactly like in Finnish and Swedish Ü/ü is alphabetized as y, not u.
In dictionaries, grammars and other reference works, the letter  is used to indicate .
 The combinations  and  indicate the consonants  and  respectively.

Additional marks are used in writing Skolt Sámi words:
 A prime symbol ʹ (U+02B9 MODIFIER LETTER PRIME) or standalone acute accent ´ or ˊ (U+00B4 ACUTE ACCENT or U+02CA MODIFIER LETTER ACUTE ACCENT) is added after the vowel of a syllable to indicate suprasegmental palatalization.
It is also placed between identical consonants to indicate that they belong to separate prosodic feet, and should not be combined into a geminate. It distinguishes e.g. lueʹštted "to set free" from its causative lueʹštʼted "to cause to set free".
 A hyphen – is used in compound words when there are two identical consonants at the juncture between the parts of the compound, e.g. ǩiõtt-tel "mobile phone".
 A vertical line ˈ (U+02C8 MODIFIER LETTER VERTICAL LINE), typewriter apostrophe or other similar mark indicates that a geminate consonant is long, and the preceding diphthong is short. It is placed between a pair of identical consonants which are always preceded by a diphthong. This mark is not used in normal Skolt Sámi writing, but it appears in dictionaries, grammars and other reference works.

Phonology
Special features of this Sámi language include a highly complex vowel system and a suprasegmental contrast of palatalized vs. non-palatalized stress groups; palatalized stress groups are indicated by a "softener mark", represented by the modifier letter prime (ʹ).

Vowels
The system of vowel phonemes is as follows:

Skolt Sámi has vowel length, but it co-occurs with contrasts in length of the following consonant(s). Before a long consonant, vowels are short, while before a short consonant vowels are long (written with a doubled letter). For example, leʹtt ‘vessel’ vs. leeʹtt ‘vessels’.

The vowels can combine to form twelve opening diphthongs:

Like the monophthongs, all diphthongs can be short or long, but this is not indicated in spelling. Short diphthongs are distinguished from long ones by both length and stress placement: short diphthongs have a stressed second component, whereas long diphthongs have stress on the first component.

Diphthongs may also have two variants depending on whether they occur in a plain or palatalized environment. This has a clearer effect with diphthongs whose second element is back or central. Certain inflectional forms, including the addition of the palatalizing suprasegmental, also trigger a change in diphthong quality.

Consonants
The inventory of consonant phonemes is the following:

 Unvoiced stops and affricates are pronounced preaspirated after vowels and sonorant consonants.
 Voiced stops and affricates are usually pronounced just weakly voiced.
 Older speakers realize the palatal affricates  as plosives .
 In initial position,  is realized as glottal .

Consonants may be phonemically short or long (geminate) both word-medially or word-finally; both are exceedingly common. Long and short consonants also contrast in consonant clusters, cf. kuõskkâd 'to touch' : kuõskâm 'I touch'. A short period of voicelessness or h, known as preaspiration, before geminate consonants is observed, much as in Icelandic, but this is not marked orthographically, e.g. joʹǩǩe 'to the river' is pronounced .

Suprasegmentals

There is one phonemic suprasegmental, the palatalizing suprasegmental that affects the pronunciation of an entire syllable. In written language the palatalizing suprasegmental is indicated with a free-standing acute accent between a stressed vowel and the following consonant, as follows:

 vääʹrr 'mountain, hill' (suprasegmental palatalization present)
 cf. väärr 'trip' (no suprasegmental palatalization)

The suprasegmental palatalization has three distinct phonetic effects:

 The stressed vowel is pronounced as slightly more fronted in palatalized syllables than in non-palatalized ones.
 When the palatalizing suprasegmental is present, the following consonant or consonant cluster is pronounced as weakly palatalized. Suprasegmental palatalization is independent of segmental palatals: inherently palatal consonants (i.e. consonants with palatal place of articulation) such as the palatal glide , the palatal nasal  (spelled ) and the palatal lateral approximant  (spelled ) can occur both in non-palatalized and suprasegmentally palatalized syllables.
 If the word form is monosyllabic and ends in a consonant, a non-phonemic weakly voiced or unvoiced vowel is pronounced after the final consonant. This vowel is e-colored if suprasegmental palatalization is present, but a-colored if not.

Stress

Skolt Sámi has four different types of stress for words:

 Primary stress
 Secondary stress
 Tertiary stress
 Zero stress

The first syllable of any word is always the primary stressed syllable in Skolt Sámi as Skolt is a fixed-stress language. In words with two or more syllables, the final syllable is quite lightly stressed (tertiary stress) and the remaining syllable, if any, are stressed more heavily than the final syllable, but less than the first syllable (secondary stress).

Using the abessive and the comitative singular in a word appears to disrupt this system, however, in words of more than one syllable. The suffix, as can be expected, has tertiary stress, but the penultimate syllable also has tertiary stress, even though it would be expected to have secondary stress.

Zero stress can be said to be a feature of conjunctions, postpositions, particles and monosyllabic pronouns.

Grammar

Skolt Sámi is a synthetic, highly inflected language that shares many grammatical features with the other Uralic languages. However, Skolt Sámi is not a typical agglutinative language like many of the other Uralic languages are, as it has developed considerably into the direction of a fusional language, much like Estonian. Therefore, cases and other grammatical features are also marked by modifications to the root and not just marked with suffixes. Many of the suffixes in Skolt Sámi are portmanteau morphemes that express several grammatical features at a time.

Umlaut

Umlaut is a pervasive phenomenon in Skolt Sámi, whereby the vowel in the second syllable affects the quality of the vowel in the first. The presence or absence of palatalisation can also be considered an umlaut effect, since it is also conditioned by the second-syllable vowel, although it affects the entire syllable rather than the vowel alone. Umlaut is complicated by the fact that many of the second-syllable vowels have disappeared in Skolt Sámi, leaving the umlaut effects as their only trace.

The following table lists the Skolt Sámi outcomes of the Proto-Samic first-syllable vowel, for each second-syllable vowel.

Some notes:
 iẹʹ and uẹʹ appear before a quantity 2 consonant, eäʹ and uäʹ otherwise.

As can be seen, palatalisation is present before original second-syllable *ē and *i, and absent otherwise. Where they survive in Skolt Sámi, both appear as e, so only the umlaut effect can distinguish them. The original short vowels *ë, *u and *i have a general raising and backing effect on the preceding vowel, while the effect of original *ā and *ō is lowering. Original *ē is fronting (palatalising) without having an effect on height.

Nouns

Cases
Skolt Sámi has 9 cases in the singular (7 of which also have a plural form), although the genitive and accusative are often the same.

The following table shows the inflection of čuäcc ('rotten snag') with the single morphemes marking noun stem, number, and case separated by hyphens for better readability. The last morpheme marks for case, i marks the plural, and a is due to epenthesis and does not have a meaning of its own.

Nominative
Like the other Uralic languages, the nominative singular is unmarked and indicates the subject or a predicate. The nominative plural is also unmarked and always looks the same as the genitive singular.

Genitive
The genitive singular is unmarked and looks the same as the nominative plural. The genitive plural is marked by an -i. The genitive is used:

 to indicate possession (Tuʹst lij muu ǩeʹrjj. 'You have my book.' where muu is gen.)
 to indicate number, if said the number is between 2 and 6. (Sieʹzzest lij kuõʹhtt põõrt. 'My father's sister (my aunt) has two houses.', where põõrt is gen.)
 with prepositions (rääi + [GEN]: 'by something', 'beyond something')
 with most postpositions. (Sij mõʹnne ääkkäd årra. 'They went to your grandmother's (house).', 'They went to visit your grandmother.', where ääkkäd is gen)

The genitive has been replacing the partitive for some time and is nowadays more commonly used in its place.

Accusative
The accusative is the direct object case and it is unmarked in the singular. In the plural, its marker is -d, which is preceded by the plural marker -i, making it look the same as the plural illative. The accusative is also used to mark some adjuncts, e.g. obb tääʹlv ('the entire winter').

Locative
The locative marker in the singular is -st and -n in the plural. This case is used to indicate:

 where something is (Kuäʹđest lij ǩeʹrjj: 'There is a book in the kota.')
 where it is coming from (Niõđ puõʹtte domoi Čeʹvetjääuʹrest: 'The girls came home from Sevettijärvi.')
 who has possession of something (Suʹst lij čâustõk: 'He/she has a lasso.')

In addition, it is used with certain verbs:

 to ask someone s.t. : kõõččâd [+loc]

Illative
The illative marker actually has three different markers in the singular to represent the same case: -a, -e and -u. The plural illative marker is -d, which is preceded by the plural marker -i, making it look the same as the plural accusative. This case is used to indicate:

 where something is going
 who is receiving something
 the indirect object

Comitative
The comitative marker in the singular is -in and -vuiʹm in the plural. The comitative is used to state with whom or what something was done:

 Njääʹlm sekstet leeiʹnin. The mouth is wiped with a piece of cloth.
 Vuõʹlǧǧem paaʹrnivuiʹm ceerkvest. I left church with the children.
 Vuõʹlǧǧem vueʹbbinan ceerkvest. I left church with my sister.

To form the comitative singular, use the genitive singular form of the word as the root and -in. To form the comitative plural, use the plural genitive root and -vuiʹm.

Abessive
The abessive marker is -tää in both the singular and the plural. It always has a tertiary stress.

 Vuõʹlǧǧem paaʹrnitää ceerkvest. I left church without the children.
 Sij mõʹnne niõđtää põʹrtte. They went in the house without the girl.
 Sij mõʹnne niõđitää põʹrtte. They went in the house without the girls.

Essive
The dual form of the essive is still used with pronouns, but not with nouns and does not appear at all in the plural.

Partitive
The partitive is only used in the singular and can be replaced by the genitive in most cases. The partitive marker is -d.

1. It appears after numbers larger than six:

 kääuʹc čâustõkkâd: 'eight lassos'

This can be replaced with kääʹuc čâustõõǥǥ.

2. It is also used with certain postpositions:

 kuäʹtte'd vuâstta: 'against a kota'

This can be replaced with kuäʹđ vuâstta

3. It can be used with the comparative to express that which is being compared:

 kåʹlled pueʹrab: 'better than gold'

This would nowadays more than likely be replaced by pueʹrab ko kåʹll

Pronouns

Personal pronouns 
The personal pronouns have three numbers: singular, plural and dual. The following table contains personal pronouns in the nominative and genitive/accusative cases.

The next table demonstrates the declension of a personal pronoun he/she (no gender distinction) in various cases:

Possessive markers 
Next to number and case, Skolt Sámi nouns also inflect for possession. However, usage of possessive affixes seems to decrease among speakers. The following table shows possessive inflection of the word muõrr ('tree').

Verbs
Skolt Sámi verbs inflect (inflection of verbs is also referred to as conjugation) for person, mood, number, and tense. A full inflection table of all person-marked forms of the verb kuullâd ('to hear') is given below. 

It can be seen that inflection involves changes to the verb stem as well as inflectional suffixes. Changes to the stem are based on verbs being categorized into several inflectional classes. The different inflectional suffixes are based on the categories listed below.

Person

Skolt Sámi verbs conjugate for four grammatical persons:

 first person
 second person
 third person
 fourth person, also called the indefinite person

Mood

Skolt Sámi has 5 grammatical moods:

 indicative
 imperative (Pueʹtted sõrgg domoi! 'Come home soon!')
 conditional
 potential
 optative

Number

Skolt Sámi verbs conjugate for two grammatical numbers:

 singular
 plural

Unlike other Sámi varieties, Skolt Sámi verbs do not inflect for dual number. Instead, verbs occurring with the dual personal pronouns appear in the corresponding plural form.

Tense

Skolt Sámi has 2 simple tenses:

 past (Puõʹttem škoouʹle jåhtta. 'I came to school yesterday.')
 non-past (Evvan puätt mu årra täʹbbe. 'John is coming to my house today.')

and 2 compound tenses:

 perfect
 pluperfect

Non-finite verb forms 
The verb forms given above are person-marked, also referred to as finite. In addition to the finite forms, Skolt Sámi verbs have twelve participial and converb forms, as well as the infinitive, which are non-finite. These forms are given in the table below for the verb kuullâd ('to hear').

Auxiliary verbs 
Skolt Sámi has two auxiliary verbs, one of which is lee´d (glossed as 'to be'), the other one is the negative auxiliary verb (see the following paragraph).

Inflection of lee´d is given below.

Lee'd is used, for example, to assign tense to lexical verbs in the conditional or potential mood which are not marked for tense themselves:

 Jiõm âʹte mon ni kõõjjče, jos mon teâđčem, leʹččem veär raajjâm ouddâl.

(negation (1st P. Sg.) – then – 1st P. Sg. – even – ask (negated conditional) – if – 1st P. Sg. – know (1st P. Sg. conditional) – be (1st P. Sg. conditional) – soup – make (past participle, no tense marking) – before)

'I wouldn't even ask if I knew, if I had made soup before!'

Negative verb

Skolt Sámi, like Finnish, the other Sámi languages and Estonian, has a negative verb. In Skolt Sámi, the negative verb conjugates according to mood (indicative, imperative and optative), person (1st, 2nd, 3rd and 4th) and number (singular and plural).

              
Note that ij + leat is usually written as iʹlla, iʹlleäkku, iʹllää or iʹllä and ij + leat is usually written as jeäʹla or jeäʹlä.

Unlike the other Sámi languages, Skolt Sámi no longer has separate forms for the dual and plural of the negative verb and uses the plural forms for both instead.

Word order

Declarative clauses 
The most frequent word order in simple, declarative sentences in Skolt Sámi is subject–verb–object (SVO). However, as cases are used to mark relations between different noun phrases, and verb forms mark person and number of the subject, Skolt Sámi word order allows for some variation.

An example of an SOV sentence would be:

 Neezzan suâjjkååutid kuårru. (woman (Pl., Nominative) – protection (Sg., Nominative) + skirt (Pl., Accusative) – sew (3rd P. Pl., Past)) 'The women sewed protective skirts.'

Intransitive sentences follow the order subject-verb (SV):

 Jääuʹr kâʹlmme. (lake (Pl., Nominative) – freeze (3rd P. Pl., Present)) 'The lakes freeze.'

An exception to the SOV word order can be found in sentences with an auxiliary verb. While in other languages, an OV word order has been found to correlate with the auxiliary verb coming after the lexical verb, the Skolt Sámi auxiliary verb lee'd ('to be') precedes the lexical verb. This has been related to the verb-second (V2) phenomenon which binds the finite verb to at most the second position of the respective clause. However, in Skolt Sámi, this effect seems to be restricted to clauses with an auxiliary verb.

An example of a sentence with the auxiliary in V2 position:

 Kuuskõõzz leʹjje ääld poorrâm. (northern light (Pl., Nominative) – be (3rd P. Pl., Past) – female reindeer (Sg., Accusative) – eat (Past Participle)) 'The northern lights had eaten the female reindeer.'

Interrogative clauses

Polar questions 
In Skolt Sámi, polar questions, also referred to as yes-no questions, are marked in two different ways. Morphologically, an interrogative particle, -a,  is added as an affix to the first word of the clause. Syntactically, the element which is in the scope of the question is moved to the beginning of the clause. If this element is the verb, subject and verb are inversed in comparison to the declarative SOV word order.

 Vueʹlǧǧveʹted–a tuäna muu ooudâst eččan ääuʹd ool? (leave (2nd P. Pl., Present, Interrogative) – 2nd P. Dual Nominative – 1st P. Sg. Genitive – behalf – father (Sg. Genitive 1st P. Pl.) – grave (Sg. Genitive) – onto) 'Will the two of you go, on my behalf, to our father's grave?'

If an auxiliary verb is used, this is the one which is moved to the initial sentence position and also takes the interrogative affix.

 Leäk–a ääʹvääm tõn uus? (be (2nd P. Sg., Present, Interrogative) – open (Past Participle) – that (Sg. Accusative) – door (Sg. Accusative)) 'Have you opened that door?'
 Leäk–a ton Jefremoff? (be (2nd P. Sg., Interrogative) – 2nd P. Sg. Nominative – Jefremoff) 'Are you Mr. Jefremoff?'

A negated polar question, using the negative auxiliary verb, shows the same structure:

 Ij–a kõskklumâs villjad puättam? (Negation 3rd P. Sg., Interrogative – middle – brother (Sg. Nominative, 2nd P. Sg.) – come (Past Participle)) 'Didn't your middle brother come?'

An example of the interrogative particle being added to something other than the verb, would be the following:

 Võl–a lie mainnâz? (still (Interrogative) – be (3rd P. Sg., Present) – story (Pl., Nominative)) 'Are there still stories to tell?'

Information questions 
Information questions in Skolt Sámi are formed with a question word in clause-initial position. There also is a gap in the sentence indicating the missing piece of information. This kind of structure is similar to Wh-movement in languages such as English. There are mainly three question words corresponding to the English 'what', 'who', and 'which' (out of two). They inflect for number and case, except for the latter which only has singular forms. It is noteworthy that the illative form of mii ('what') corresponds to the English 'why'. The full inflectional paradigm of all three question words can be found below.

Some examples of information questions using one of the three question words:

 Mâiʹd reäǥǥak? (what (Sg., Accusative) – cry (2nd P. Sg., Present)) 'What are you crying about?'
 Mõõzz pueʹttiǩ? (what (Sg., Illative) – come (2nd P. Sg., Past)) 'Why did you come?'
 Ǩii tuʹst leäi risttjeäʹnn? (who (Sg., Nominative) – 2nd P. Sg., Locative – be (3rd P. Sg., Past) – godmother (Sg., Nominative) 'Who was your godmother?'
 Kuäbbaž alttad heibbad? (which (Sg., Nominative) – begin (3rd P. Sg., Present) – wrestle (Infinitive)) 'Which one of you will begin to wrestle?'

In addition to the above-mentioned, there are other question words which are not inflected, such as the following:

 koʹst: 'where', 'from where'
 koozz: 'to where'
 kuäʹss: 'when'
 mäʹhtt: 'how'
 måkam: 'what kind'

An example sentence would be the following:

 Koozz vuõʹlǧǧiǩ? (to where – leave (2nd P. Sg., Past)) 'Where did you go?'

Imperative clauses 
The Skolt Sámi imperative generally takes a clause-initial position. Out of the five imperative forms (see above), those of the second person are most commonly used.

 Puäʹđ mij årra kuâssa! (come (2nd P. Sg., Imperative) – 1st P. Pl., Genitive – way – on a visit) 'Come and visit us at our place!'

Imperatives in the first person form, which only exist as plurals, are typically used for hortative constructions, that is for encouraging the listener (not) to do something. These imperatives include both the speaker and the listener.

 Äʹlǧǧep heibbad! (start (1st P. Pl., Imperative) – wrestle (Infinitive)) 'Let's start to wrestle!'

Finally, imperatives in the third person are used in jussive constructions, the mood used for orders and commands.

 Kuärŋŋaz sij tieʹrm ool! (climb (3rd P. Pl., Imperative) – 3rd P. Pl., Nominative – hill (Sg., Genitive) – onto) 'Let them climb to the top of the hill!'

References

Bibliography 
 Feist, Timothy. A Grammar of Skolt Saami. Manchester, 2010.
 Feist, Timothy. A Grammar of Skolt Saami Suomalais-Ugrilainen Seura Helsinki 2015.
 Korhonen, Mikko. Mosnikoff, Jouni. Sammallahti, Pekka. Koltansaamen opas. Castreanumin toimitteita, Helsinki 1973.
 Mosnikoff, Jouni and Pekka Sammallahti. Uʹcc sääm-lääʹdd sääʹnnǩeârjaž = Pieni koltansaame-suomi sanakirja. Jorgaleaddji 1988.
 Mosnikoff, Jouni and Pekka Sammallahti. Suomi-koltansaame sanakirja = Lääʹdd-sääʹm sääʹnnǩeʹrjj. Ohcejohka : Girjegiisá 1991.
 Moshnikoff, Satu. Muu vuõssmõs sääʹmǩeʹrjj 1987.
 Sámi Language Act

External links

 The Children's TV series Binnabánnaš in Skolt Sámi 
 Nuõrttsääʹmǩiõl alfabeeʹtt – koltankieliset aakkoset Skolt Saami alphabet by the Finnish Saami Parliament
 Say it in Saami Yle's colloquial Northern Saami-Inari Saami-Skolt Saami-English phrasebook online
 Surrey Morphology Group – Skolt Saami
Skolt Saami verb paradigm visualisations. Feist,Timothy, Matthew Baerman, Greville G. Corbett & Erich Round. 2019. Surrey Lexical Splits Visualisations (Skolt Saami). University of Surrey.  https://lexicalsplits.surrey.ac.uk/skoltsaami.html
Kimberli Mäkäräinen A very small Skolt Sámi – English vocabulary (< 500 words)
 Skolt Sámi - Finnish/English/Russian dictionary (robust finite-state, open-source)
 Northern Sámi – Inari Sámi – Skolt Sámi – English dictionary (requires a password nowadays)
 Names of birds found in Sápmi in a number of languages, including Skolt Sámi and English. Search function only works with Finnish input though.
 Sääʹmjieʹllem Sámi Museum site on the history of the Skolt Sámi in Finland
 Zita McRobbie-Utasi A number of linguistic articles on Skolt Sámi.
 Erkki Lumisalmi talks in Skolt Sámi (archive) (mp3)
  The Palatalization Mark in Skolt Sámi.

Languages of Finland
Languages of Russia
Fusional languages
Sámi in Finland
Sámi in Russia
Eastern Sámi languages
Skolts
Endangered Uralic languages